Wally Mitchell (18 June 1908 – 8 February 1974) was an Australian rules footballer who played with Fitzroy in the Victorian Football League (VFL).

Notes

External links 

1908 births
1974 deaths
Australian rules footballers from Ballarat
Fitzroy Football Club players